Chacras de Coria is a small town located in an oasis in the north of the province of Mendoza, Argentina, a few kilometers from the capital city.

Due to its characteristics of a micro-climate during summer months, the area is popular for recreation. It relies on tourism generated through its wineries and museums, things which have resulted in a busy food pole and variety.

External links

Populated places in Mendoza Province